TCDD DE11000 is a series of diesel-electric locomotives used by the Turkish State Railways. The batch consisted of 85 units delivered from 1985. The first 20 locomotives were built by Krauss-Maffei, the remaining 65 on licence by Tülomsaş. There are two series of the locomotive, the first 15 having direct current motors, the latter 70 having alternating current motors. The units have Bo'Bo' wheel arrangement and are powered by 720 kW engines (depending on model) Most of these are scrapped, some of these were converted to diesel-hydraulic traction, remaining ones are working in yard duties. It is possible to switch between either control stand of the cab even while moving.

References

External links
 Tülomsaş on DE11000
 Trains of Turkey on DE11000

Bo-Bo locomotives
Krauss-Maffei locomotives
Tülomsaş locomotives
DE11000
Standard gauge locomotives of Turkey
Railway locomotives introduced in 1985